Henry Cattan (1906–1992) was a renowned Palestinian jurist and writer.
 
Cattan,  son of  Naklih Cattan, was born in what is now West Jerusalem. He was educated at the University of Paris and the University of London. After qualifying as a barrister, he lectured at the Jerusalem Law School from 1932 to 1942, practised law in Palestine and Syria, and was a member of the Palestine Law Council until 1948. 

He testified before the Anglo-American Committee of Inquiry on Palestine in 1946. He was a member of the delegation which represented the Arab Higher Committee before the United Nations General Assembly in 1947 and 1948. Other people nominated for this delegation were Jamal al-Husayni, Emil Ghoury, Wasef Kamal, Issa Nakhleh and Rasem Khalidi.

Selected publications
 Palestine, the Arabs, and Israel (1969)
 The Palestine Question (1988)
 Palestine: The Road to Peace
 Palestine and International Law
The Status of Jerusalem (1981)

1906 births
1992 deaths
People from Jerusalem
Palestinian writers
Alumni of the University of London
University of Paris alumni
Mandatory Palestine expatriates in the United Kingdom
Mandatory Palestine expatriates in France